The 2002 season was Molde's 27th season in the top flight of Norwegian football. In Tippeligaen they finished in 2nd position, six points behind Rosenborg.

Molde participated in the Norwegian Cup. On 26 June 2002, Molde was defeated 0-1 at away ground by Hødd in the third round.

Squad

As of end of season.

Competitions

Tippeligaen

Results summary

Results by round

Results

League table

Norwegian Cup

Squad statistics

Appearances and goals

                                 

        
|-
|colspan="14"|Players away from Molde on loan:
|-
|colspan="14"|Players who left Molde during the season:
|}

Goal Scorers

See also
Molde FK seasons

References

External links
nifs.no

2002
Molde